Gianpietro Gilardi (born 11 January 1938) is an Italian rower. He competed at the 1964 Summer Olympics in Tokyo with the men's eight where they came sixth.

References

1938 births
Living people
Italian male rowers
Olympic rowers of Italy
Rowers at the 1964 Summer Olympics
Sportspeople from the Province of Lecco
European Rowing Championships medalists
People from Mandello del Lario